The Railway Museum is a museum in Livingstone, Zambia, dedicated to preserving Zambia's railway heritage, as well as holding an exhibition on the history of Jews in Zambia.

References

Museums in Zambia

External links

 – unofficial web page

Railway museums in Zambia
Livingstone, Zambia
Buildings and structures in Southern Province, Zambia
Tourist attractions in Southern Province, Zambia